The Giles Ministry was the ministry of the tenth Chief Minister of the Northern Territory, Adam Giles. It came into operation on 14 March 2013, following the replacement of Terry Mills as Chief Minister and leader of the Country Liberal Party by Adam Giles.  It ended on 31 August 2016, when Labor leader Michael Gunner became Chief Minister following his victory at the 2016 election.

First ministry (14 March 2013 – 19 March 2013)

Second ministry (20 March 2013 – 8 August 2013)

Third ministry (9 August 2013 – 9 September 2013)

Fourth ministry (10 September 2013 – 15 September 2013)

On 9 September 2013, Chief Minister Giles announced that he would be "refreshing" his cabinet. Alison Anderson was removed from the ministry and her portfolios assigned to others. Bess Price joined the ministry. The new ministry was sworn in by the Administrator of the Northern Territory the next day.

Fifth ministry (16 September 2013 – 23 August 2014)

Sixth ministry (24 August 2014 – 11 December 2014)

Seventh ministry (12 December 2014 – 19 January 2015)

Eighth ministry (20 January 2015 – 3 February 2015)

Ninth ministry (4 February 2015 – 10 February 2015)

On 2 February 2015, cabinet member Willem Westra van Holthe challenged Chief Minister Adam Giles for the leadership of the Country Liberal Party, and announced that the party had voted him as leader and chief minister apparent. The next day, Giles refused to resign as chief minister and after a meeting of the parliamentary wing of the CLP, emerged to announce that he was still the leader and that Westra van Holthe would be his deputy. On 4 February, Robyn Lambley was expelled from Cabinet for supporting the challenge.

Tenth ministry (11 February 2015 – 14 February 2016)

A further reshuffle was held following the resignation of Matt Conlan from Cabinet on 10 February.

Eleventh ministry (15 February 2016 – 18 July 2016)

Twelfth ministry (19 July 2016 – 25 July 2016)

Thirteenth ministry (26 July 2016 – 27 August 2016)

John Elferink was sacked as Minister for Correctional Services on 26 July 2016, with Adam Giles assuming the portfolio.

References

External links
The Chief Minister and the Cabinet

Giles 1